Switzerland competed at the 2014 Winter Olympics in Sochi, Russia, from 7 to 23 February 2014. 163 athletes were participating, making it the largest team Switzerland has ever sent to the Olympic Winter Games. The four-time Olympic gold medalist Simon Ammann was the flag bearer for the opening ceremony.

Medalists

Alpine skiing 

The Swiss Olympic selection committee named the following 21 athletes to the Winter Olympic team. Both Silvan Zurbriggen and Nadja Kamer were selected to the team but did not compete in any race.

Men

Women

Biathlon 

Based on their performance at the 2012 and 2013 Biathlon World Championships, Switzerland qualified 5 men and 4 women.

Men

Women

Mixed

Bobsleigh 

Switzerland qualified a total of thirteen athletes in the following sleds. The qualification was based on the world rankings as of 20 January 2014.

Men

* – Denotes the driver of each sled

Women

* – Denotes the driver of each sled

Cross-country skiing

Distance
Men

Women

Sprint
Men

Women

Curling 

Based on results from 2012 World Women's Curling Championship and the 2013 World Women's Curling Championship, and based on the 2012 World Men's Curling Championship and the 2013 World Men's Curling Championship, Switzerland qualified a women's team and a men's team (consisting of five athletes) as one of the seven highest ranked nations.

Men's tournament 

Roster - Sven Michel, Simon Gempeler, Claudio Pätz, Benoit Schwarz, Sandro Trolliet

Preliminary round

Round-robin

Draw 1
Monday, 10 February, 9:00 am

Draw 2
Monday, 10 February, 7:00 pm

Draw 4
Wednesday, 12 February, 9:00 am

Draw 5
Wednesday, 12 February, 7:00 pm

Draw 6
Thursday, 14 February, 2:00 pm

Draw 8
Friday, 14 February, 7:00 pm

Draw 9
Saturday, 15 February, 2:00 pm

Draw 11
Sunday, 16 February, 7:00 pm

Draw 12
Monday, 17 February, 2:00 pm

Women's tournament 

Roster – Mirjam Ott, Janine Greiner, Carmen Küng, Alina Pätz, Carmen Schäfer

Preliminary round

Round-robin

Draw 1
Monday, 10 February, 2:00 pm

Draw 2
Tuesday, 11 February, 9:00 am

Draw 3
Tuesday, 11 February, 7:00 pm

Draw 5
Thursday, 13 February, 9:00 am

Draw 6
Thursday, 13 February, 7:00 pm

Draw 7
Friday, 14 February, 2:00 pm

Draw 9
Saturday, 15 February, 7:00 pm

Draw 10
Sunday, 16 February, 2:00 pm

Draw 12
Monday, 17 February, 7:00 pm

Semifinal
Wednesday, 19 February, 2:00 pm

Bronze medal game
Thursday, 20 February, 12:30 pm'

Freestyle skiing 

24 Swiss freestyle skiers (10 women and 14 men) were competing in 4 disciplines. On 22 January 2014, the Swiss Olympic committee selected 5 athletes for the Aerials team. Thomas Lambert and Renato Ulrich were competing in their third consecutive Winter Olympics. On 23 January 2014, 6 athletes joined the slopestyle team, a sport that made its first appearance at the Olympics. On 27 January 2014, 7 athletes were selected for the ski cross team. The 2010 Olympic champion Michael Schmid and the 2013 World champion Fanny Smith were competing for the second time. 6 athletes were selected for the Halfpipe team, a sport that was also part of the Winter Olympics for the first time.

Aerials

Halfpipe

Ski cross

Qualification legend: FA – Qualify to medal round; FB – Qualify to consolation round

Slopestyle

Ice hockey 

Switzerland qualified a men's team by being one of the 9 highest ranked teams in the IIHF World Ranking following the 2012 World Championships. The women's team qualified by being one of the 5 highest ranked teams in the IIHF World Ranking following the 2012 Women's World Championships.

Men's tournament

Roster

Group stage

Qualification playoffs

Women's tournament

Roster

Group stage

Quarterfinal

Semifinal

Bronze medal game

Luge 

Switzerland qualified two athletes (one man and one woman) in the luge.

Nordic combined

Skeleton

Ski jumping

Snowboarding 

24 Swiss snowboarders were competing in 5 disciplines, including the new events of parallel slalom and slopestyle. It will be the largest team competing in Sochi along with Canada and the United States. The two-time Olympic champion Philipp Schoch will be competing in his third Olympics, while his brother Simon Schoch, the 2006 silver medalist, will be participating in his fourth consecutive Games.

Alpine
Men

Women

Freestyle
Halfpipe

Qualification Legend: QF – Qualify directly to final; QS – Qualify to semifinal

Slopestyle

Qualification Legend: QF – Qualify directly to final; QS – Qualify to semifinal

Snowboard cross

Qualification legend: FA – Qualify to medal round; FB – Qualify to consolation round
* Qualify immediately to consolation round after being disqualified in the semifinals

References

External links 

Swtizerland at the 2014 Winter Olympics

Nations at the 2014 Winter Olympics
2014
Winter Olympics